Sir Robert Arnold McLeod  (born ) is a tax specialist in New Zealand. In the 2019 New Year Honours, he was appointed a Knight Companion of the New Zealand Order of Merit, for services to business and Māori.

References

Year of birth missing (living people)
Living people
New Zealand accountants
Knights Companion of the New Zealand Order of Merit
1950s births